Brereton is a village in Saint Philip Parish in Barbados. The Brereton name started with a John Brereton who traveled to Barbados in 1654.
Brereton is situated nearby to Bentleys.

Populated places in Barbados